Shanshan County as the official romanized name, also transliterated from Uyghur as Piqan County, is a county within the Xinjiang Uyghur Autonomous Region and is under the administrative jurisdiction of the prefecture-level city of Turpan.

The county seat is in Shanshan Town.

Name
The county is named after the ancient Shanshan Kingdom, although the kingdom was actually located mostly outside of the borders of the modern county, in the Lop Nur area. The place was originally named Piqian, and the Grand coordinator and provincial governor of Xinjiang proposed the name of Shanshan when Guangxu Emperor decided to set up a county in 1902.

History
The local geology and the desert climate made it possible to discover a number of important fossil sites in the area, including China's largest cluster of fossilized dinosaur tracks and China's largest dinosaur.
Important dinosaur sites are associated with the Lianmuqin Formation (named after Lianmuqin Town) and the Subashi Formation (named after Subashi Village in Tuyugou Township. The Shanshanosaurus is named after Shanshan.

In 2008–2011, a team of German and Chinese paleontologists discovered and studied an "enormous" accumulation of Jurassic turtle fossils at a site they nicknamed "Mesa Chelonia", approximately  NNE of Shanshan Town. It is estimated that at least 1,800 skeletons of freshwater turtles, preliminary identified as belonging to the Annemys species were buried in this bone bed, in a stratigraphic layer probably belonging to the Qigu Formation. The researchers suggest that during a drought the turtles congregating at one of the few remaining water sources, and died there once that last water hole dried out. Then the skeletons were transported to the present location by a debris flow during a catastrophic rainfall event, forming a Konzentrat-Lagerstätte.

According to the paleontologist Walter Joyce, the Shanshan find has more than doubled the total number of Jurassic turtle specimens known to science. The excavated fossils have been transported to Shanshan Town, where they will be housed in the county museum (currently under construction).

On January 6, 2009, five well-preserved mummies of ethnic Han men who lived during the Qing dynasty were excavated at a construction site near the Flaming Mountains in the county.

In June 2013, an incident in Lukchun lead to the deaths of dozens.

Geography
Biratar Bulak is a spring in the southern part of the county.

Climate

Demographics

Transportation
Shanshan is served by China National Highway 312, the Lanzhou–Xinjiang Railway and Shanshan Airport.

References

County-level divisions of Xinjiang
Turpan